Sir Richard Reynell, son of Sir Richard Reynell, of Pyttney (Pitney today), was a knight to whom King John restored the lands of which his father had been deprived, on condition that he should serve him with horse and armour for one year. Details of this arrangement appear in a deed dated at Bined, 27 July 1214, a copy of which is in the Harleian MSS. No. 1195.

He left a son and successor, Walter Reynell, of Pyttney.

References

People from Somerset
Richard